Solmundaeginidae is a family of hydrozoans in the order Narcomedusae.

Taxonomy 
The  following genera are recognized in the family Solmundaeginidae:

 Aeginopsis Brandt, 1835
 Solmundaegina Lindsay, 2017
 Solmundella Haeckel, 1879

References 

 
Narcomedusae
Cnidarian families